Acceptable Risk may refer to:

 Acceptable risk
 Acceptable Risk (novel), a 1995 novel by Robin Cook
 Acceptable Risk (film), a 2001 American TV film directed by William A. Graham
 Acceptable Risk (TV series), a 2017 Irish television series